Charmed is an American fantasy drama television series developed by Jennie Snyder Urman, Jessica O'Toole and Amy Rardin based on the original series created by Constance M. Burge. It premiered on October 14, 2018, on The CW. The show follows the life of three sisters who are destined to battle the forces of evil.

The third season premiered on January 24, 2021. On February 3, 2021, The CW renewed the series for a fourth season which premiered on March 11, 2022. On May 12, 2022, The CW canceled the series after four seasons.

Series overview

Episodes

Season 1 (2018–19)

Season 2 (2019–20)

Season 3 (2021)

Season 4 (2022)

Ratings

Season 1

Season 2

Season 3

Season 4

References

Charmed (2018 TV series)
Charmed (2018 TV series)